Center Township is one of the fifteen townships of Noble County, Ohio, United States.  The 2000 census found 1,027 people in the township, 818 of whom lived in the unincorporated portions of the township.

Geography
Located at the center of the county, it borders the following townships:
Seneca Township - northeast
Marion Township - east
Stock Township - southeast
Enoch Township - south
Olive Township - southwest
Noble Township - west
Buffalo Township - northwest

The village of Sarahsville, the fourth largest village in Noble County, is located in central Center Township.  A small corner of Caldwell, the county seat, also extends into the far southwest of the township.

Name and history
Center Township was established in 1851. It is one of nine Center Townships statewide.

Government
The township is governed by a three-member board of trustees, who are elected in November of odd-numbered years to a four-year term beginning on the following January 1. Two are elected in the year after the presidential election and one is elected in the year before it. There is also an elected township fiscal officer, who serves a four-year term beginning on April 1 of the year after the election, which is held in November of the year before the presidential election. Vacancies in the fiscal officership or on the board of trustees are filled by the remaining trustees.

References

External links
Noble County Chamber of Commerce 

Townships in Noble County, Ohio
Townships in Ohio